Table tennis competitions at the 2017 Islamic Solidarity Games was held from 17 May to 22 May 2017 at the Sarhadchi Arena, Baku, Azerbaijan.

Medalists

Medal table

References

External links 
Results

2017 Islamic Solidarity Games
2017
Islamic Solidarity Games
Table tennis in Azerbaijan